Hayward Executive Airport  is a municipal airport in Hayward, California. The National Plan of Integrated Airport Systems for 2011–2015 categorized it as a reliever airport. The towered airport near the east shore of San Francisco Bay was formerly the Hayward Air Terminal.

History 
The airport was built in 1942 during World War II as an auxiliary field to Chico Army Air Field and was originally Hayward Army Air Field. The primary aircraft were Lockheed P-38 Lightnings. This post may have also been named "Russell City Army Air Field" for the unincorporated area outside of the Hayward city limits where it was located. The airfield was assigned to the United States Army Air Forces Fourth Air Force.

After the war the airport was declared surplus. The airfield was then renamed Hayward Municipal Airport.

The California Air National Guard moved onto land adjoining the airport in 1949. Initially it was the home of the 61st Fighter Wing which included the 194th Fighter Squadron on June 25, 1948.

The 61st Fighter Wing was re-designated as the 144th Fighter Bomber Wing on November 1, 1950. The wing also consisted of the 192nd Fighter Squadron at Reno, Nevada and the 191st Fighter Squadron at Salt Lake City, Utah.

The North American P-51D Mustang and later the P-51H were flown from 1948 until October 31, 1954. During its early years with the P-51D/H, the unit earned prominence as one of the Air Force's most respected aerial gunnery competitors. In June 1953, while still flying the P-51, the unit qualified for the first all-jet, worldwide gunnery meet. Using borrowed F-86A Sabre jets, the 144th, which represented the Air National Guard, placed fifth in competition. This unit later relocated to Fresno Air Terminal and is now the 144th Fighter Wing of the California Air National Guard at Fresno Air National Guard Base.

On April 3, 1955, the 129th Air Resupply Squadron was established at Hayward and equipped with Curtiss C-46D Commandos in the Summer 1955 supplemented by Grumman SA-16A Albatrosses in 1958. The C-46Ds were phased out 1 November 1958, and the unit was redesignated as the 129th Troop Carrier Squadron (Medium). A control tower was built in 1960 and on January 20, 1962, the unit reached Group status with federal recognition of the 129th Troop Carrier Group.

On May 1, 1980, the remaining California Air National Guard units at Hayward were reassigned to Naval Air Station Moffett Field near San Jose. Today, this unit is the 129th Rescue Wing at Moffett Federal Airfield.

Facilities
It has one helipad, H1, .

In the year ending October 14, 2010 the airport had 86,069 aircraft operations, average 235 per day: 98% general aviation and 2% air taxi. 368 aircraft were then based at the airport: 82% single-engine, 11% multi-engine, 4% jet, and 3% helicopter.

Hayward Executive Airport is home to the Northern California division of Ameriflight as of September 15, 2012.

The airport plans to build a new administration building. The offices are now in the five-story control tower built in 1961, with Federal Aviation Administration offices in the top three floors. The new administration building will be next to the control tower and will be a bit under 5,000 square feet. It was expected to cost $2.88 million. Work was expected to begin in May 2013 and end in March 2014.

Gallery

See also 

 List of airports in the San Francisco Bay Area
 List of airports in California
 California World War II Army Airfields

References

External links 

 Hayward Executive Airport at City of Hayward website
 
 History of Hayward Airport from Hayward Airport Noise website
 Aerial image as of February 2004 from USGS The National Map
 
 

Airports in Alameda County, California
Transportation in Hayward, California
Airfields of the United States Army Air Forces in California
Military in the San Francisco Bay Area
Military history of California